Yousef Fakhro (born 3 May 1983) is a former professional footballer who played as a defender. Fakhro was called up to represent Sweden internationally at under-21 level, and Lebanon at senior level thanks to his origins.

Club career 
Born in Germany, Fakhro joined Trelleborgs FF's youth academy aged six. His debut for the senior team came in the 2002 Superettan, against Ängelholms FF. Fakhro has scored one goal in the Allsvenskan throughout his career, in an away match against Gefle IF. He played 115 league matches in 10 years for Trelleborgs FF, scoring five times.

On 1 March 2013, Fakhro signed for FC Höllviken. In December 2014, he signed for IFK Trelleborg. In the 2016 season, Fakhro signed for Division 5 side MP Pelister, where he played 15 games and scored twice in his first season. The following season, in Division 4, he scored once in three league games.

International career 
Fakhro was once called up to the Sweden national under-21 team.

Thanks to his Lebanese origins, Fakhro was called up to play for the Lebanon national team in 2008. He was called up a second time in January 2012, for a training camp before a match against Iraq.

Personal life 
Fakhro is married to a German woman of Lebanese descent.

References

External links 
 
 
 
 Yousef Fakhro at lagstatistik.se

1983 births
Living people
Swedish people of Lebanese descent
Sportspeople of Lebanese descent
Lebanese footballers
Swedish footballers
Association football defenders
Trelleborgs FF players
BK Höllviken players
IFK Trelleborg players
Superettan players
Allsvenskan players
Division 3 (Swedish football) players
Division 2 (Swedish football) players